Mynydd Epynt is a former community and upland area in Powys, Wales.

The Ministry of Defence controversially evicted the community of Mynydd Epynt in 1940, creating what is now the core of the Sennybridge Training Area (SENTA), the largest military training zone in Wales.

Etymology 
The name of the area is often given as Mynydd Eppynt or Eppynt in historical sources and it appears under this spelling in the 1911 Encyclopædia Britannica.

Mynydd is the Welsh word for "mountain" or "upland area" but the meaning of Epynt is less certain. The most commonly stated etymology is "a pathway for horses", deriving from the P-Celtic root epos, meaning "horse" (as in ebol, meaning "a foal" in Modern Welsh). However, Thomas Morgan suggested the name may be interpreted as a place where "the way (referring to the ancient mountain trackway) rises abruptly", deriving from eb- ("an issuing out") and -hynt (a "way" or "course"). A ridge continuing south-west from Mynydd Epynt is known as Mynydd Bwlch-y-groes, which may be translated as "mountain at the cross-road pass" or else "mountain at the pass of the cross".

These etymologies all suggest that the area was known since ancient times as a place where important upland routes intersected, routes still largely extant in the modern era as drovers' roads.

History

Prehistory 

The area attracted antiquarian interest from as early as 1809, when Theophilus Jones described a number of enclosures, cairns and stone circles. Modern archaeologists have surveyed the sites at Ynys Hir, Cornelau Uchaf and Twyn y Post, including what has since been described as a "prehistoric monument complex".

Many of the features on Mynydd Epynt are known to be Bronze Age in origin, but the diversity of these monuments suggest they did not share a common purpose and that there were numerous phases of construction, in different historical eras. Some of the older monuments form part of later construction areas. These older sites were either reincorporated or left undisturbed, demonstrating a continued understanding of their importance and a respect for the beliefs of previous generations and cultures. The monuments are located near the trackways that cross Mynydd Epynt, and many are positioned at crossroads.

Later history 

The modern community of Mynydd Epynt was active from at least the Medieval period, with archaeological surveys detailing preserved field systems, undisturbed by modern farming methods.

The importance of the area's trackways is evidenced by the four droving inns that were established on the northern side of Mynydd Epynt (The Griffin Inn, Tafarn y Mynydd, Spite Inn and The Drover's Arms). Following the Ministry of Defence's acquisition in 1940, the Drover's Arms became an important landmark within the Sennybridge Training Area (SENTA). The inn's exterior was restored in the 1990s despite its continued use in active military training.

The inns were part of an active Welsh-speaking community, with a school, church, and numerous chapels holding regular cultural events such as Eisteddfodau and Gymanfa Ganu. A noted custom of the community was to lay out a white sheet whenever a family was in need of help; this would act as a signal to the rest of the community, who would make their way to the house and offer their assistance.

Military acquisition 

The Ministry of Defence listed a number of properties in the area for a potential acquisition as early as the First World War. The people of Mynydd Epynt remained unaware of these plans until September 1939 when an army officer, struggling with Welsh orthography, asked children at the local school to identify and locate fifty-two homes. By December, each of these households had received a notice to vacate their property before the end of April. The letter stressed the importance of the area to the war effort and that they would be compensated for their losses.

A number of Welsh MPs and leading figures spoke out against the acquisition. However, this opposition was largely dismissed at the time as against the war effort or part of a wider anti-British sentiment. As the evictions took place during the lambing season, some farmers were granted a short extension, but all of the evictions had been completed by June 1940. In total, four hundred people were ejected and the army seized an area of 30,000 acres. The area now forms the core of the Sennybridge Training Area (SENTA), one of the largest military training zones in the UK.

Impact of the evictions 
Lewis drew comparisons with the end of the community to that of Capel Celyn, noting the comparatively young death rate of the evicted, and the belief that one resident had "cried himself to death". The historic trackways over Mynydd Epynt had long been protected as public rights of way, but all routes through the training area were closed as a result of the acquisition.

Later accounts suggest that many of the evicted believed they would return at the end of the Second World War, with accounts of people leaving their keys in locks, returning to keep the homes in a habitable condition and even continuing to plough the fields. The military had difficulty keeping some former residents away. Thomas Morgan returned to his  house Glandŵr daily to light a fire in the hearth, protecting the stonework. Morgan was repeatedly warned to stop returning, but continued until his home was destroyed by explosives, a military officer informing him that "We’ve blown up the farmhouse. You won’t need to come here any more."

The evictions were documented by Iorwerth Peate, the curator and founder of the Saint Fagan Folk Museum. Peate made several visits to the area, including on the last day of evictions. Peate evocatively described meeting one of those evicted, at her home, Waunlwyd. The elderly woman sat motionless and tearful with her back to her house (Peate later discovered that the woman was 82 years old and had been born at the property, as had her father and grandfather). Wary of the solemnity of the occasion and believing he had not been noticed, Peate tried to back away when the woman suddenly asked him where he was from. Peate answered ‘’ (the Welsh name for Cardiff), to which she replied: "" ("My little one, return there as soon as you can...") "..." ("...it is the end of the world here"). The Welsh phrase  has become associated with the evictions and is the title of the Welsh-language history of Mynydd Epynt published in 1997.

Expansion and developments 

Training operations have destroyed most of the original structures that formed the community of Mynydd Epynt, including chapels and their cemeteries. However, an artificial village was constructed in 1988. The Fighting In Built Up Areas zone (FIBUA) saw the construction of many mock buildings, including a fake chapel with imitation gravestones.

Since the 1990s, the army have expanded the SENTA area and most of Mynydd Epynt is now subject to restricted access because of the use of live ammunition and explosives. Although explosives have destroyed the agricultural land, sheep grazing continues within the area under communal grazing and letting licences.

One of the homes acquired in 1940, Disgwylfa, was refurbished in the 1990s as a conservation centre.

Despite the closure of the ancient trackways over Mynydd Epynt, SENTA's outlying areas continued to be Open Country or open access land. In 2004, The MOD created a long-distance path around the perimeter of the range. The Epynt Way is a circular route designed for walkers, horse riders and mountain-bikers.

The area was chosen as a special stage in the Wales Rally GB from 2006 to 2008.

Geography

The area of Mynydd Epynt is bounded to the south by the upper stretch of the Usk Valley and the Brecon Beacons National Park, to the north by the Irfon valley, and to the east by the valley of the River Wye. Its western boundary is less distinct but lies east of the A483 Llandovery to Llanwrtyd Wells road.

The area is an extensive plateau lying between 400 and 450m, drained by several southward-flowing rivers that empty into the River Usk; these include (from west to east) the Cilieni, Nant Bran, Afon Ysgir (with its two headwaters the Ysgir Fechan and Ysgir Fawr) and Afon Honddu. The Duhonw drains north-eastward into the River Wye. The highest point is a Marilyn (having topographic prominence of at least 150m) of 478m.

Geology 
Mynydd Epynt is largely formed from the Raglan Mudstone Formation and the St Maughans Formation of the Old Red Sandstone laid down during the latest part of the Silurian period and the succeeding Devonian period though there is little in the way of rock exposures at the surface. The northern and western escarpment of Mynydd Epynt is formed from a suite of rocks assigned to the Ludlow stage of the late Silurian and which include the Temeside Mudstone, the Tilestones, the Cae'r Mynach, Fibua, Aberedw, Cwm Craig Ddu and Irfon Formations. These consist variously of sandstones, mudstones and siltstones.

There is a broken spread of glacial till across the area resulting from its inundation by ice from the mid-Wales ice sheet to the north during the ice ages and hill peat has accumulated in some areas in post-glacial times.

Welsh TT motorcycle races

From 1948 to 1953 the area was used for yearly motorcycle road racing. Announced at the Motorcycle Live show in late 2017, a new organisation, Welsh Road Race, proposed to once again organise road racing, based on a repeal of certain clauses within the UK Road Traffic Act regulations that previously banned racing on public roads in the UK. The Secretary of State for Defence granted the organisers a licence to re-use a  circuit based on a network of private tarmacced roads contained within the Crown Estate, as was previously used to stage the historic Eppynt Motor Cycle Road Races.

The anticipated return of road racing to this area in August 2018 was cancelled in early February 2018 because of unforeseen difficulties with the Welsh Road Traffic regulations, its time-frame considered too short for the ACU-sanctioned event, and it was postponed until 2019. Unlike the Isle of Man TT races, which are free to attend, the organisers had already started to sell admission tickets via their website for the multi-category event over a long weekend.

The organisers include racer Jenny Tinmouth and former racer  and TT rider Steve Plater, who also acts as a consultant development rider to Norton Motorcycles for their new V4 RR machine.

In popular culture 
Musician Gruff Rhys has a song called "Epynt" after the mountain, which features on his first solo album Yr Atal Genhedlaeth. The song is also about money, the E standing for the Euro, and pynt sounding similar to the Welsh word for "pound".

See also
Capel Celyn, A Welsh community evacuated for the construction of a reservoir to supply water to Liverpool and Wirral.
Imber
Langford, Norfolk
Mynydd Mallaen
Tottington, Norfolk
Tyneham

References

External links
 images of Mynydd Epynt on Geograph website

 
Marilyns of Wales
Mountains and hills of Powys
Rally GB
Special Areas of Conservation in Wales
Sites of Special Scientific Interest in Brecknock
Forcibly depopulated communities in Wales